Dippen Bay is an embayment along Kilbrannan Sound on the east coast of the Kintyre Peninsula in Scotland. Coastal erosion has been documented at Dippen Bay as well as nearby Torrisdale Bay. The bay is located along the coast near the hamlet of Dippen.

See also
 Kildonald Bay

Notes

References
 Gazetteer for Scotland. 2009. Dippen: Argyll and Bute
 Escape.org, ''Coastal geology Port na Chuile to Greenport

Bays of Argyll and Bute
Kintyre